Joseph Harold Sampson Jr. (1926 – 2003) was an American mathematician known for his work in mathematical analysis, geometry and topology, especially his work about harmonic maps in collaboration with James Eells. He obtained his Ph.D. in mathematics from Princeton University in 1951 under the supervision of Salomon Bochner.

Mathematical work
In 1964, Sampson and James Eells introduced harmonic maps, which are mappings between Riemannian manifolds which solve a geometrically-defined system of partial differential equations. They can also be defined via the calculus of variations. Generalizing Bochner's work on harmonic functions, Eells and Sampson derived the Bochner identity, and used it to prove the triviality of harmonic maps under certain curvature conditions.

Eells and Sampson established the existence of harmonic maps whenever the domain manifold is closed and the target has nonpositive sectional curvature. Their proof analyzed the harmonic map heat flow, which is a geometrically-defined heat equation. By establishing a priori estimates for the flow, they were able to prove its convergence under the indicated curvature assumption. The use of the Bochner identity in deriving estimates is where the assumption on sectional curvature plays a crucial role. As a result of Eells and Sampson's (subsequential) convergence theorem, they were able to prove the existence of harmonic maps in any homotopy class. As such, harmonic maps may be regarded as canonically-defined representatives of topological spaces of mappings. This perspective has enabled the application of harmonic maps to many problems in geometry and topology.

Eells and Sampson's work is one of the most famous papers in the field of differential geometry, and was a direct inspiration for Richard Hamilton's epochal work on the Ricci flow. In addition to Eells and Sampson's heat flow, their main results on existence of harmonic maps can also be derived via the calculus of variations, using the regularity theory developed in the 1980s by Richard Schoen and Karen Uhlenbeck.

Later, in 1978, Sampson developed unique continuation, maximum principles, further rigidity theorems, and deformability results for harmonic maps. He also proved that a harmonic map of degree one between compact hyperbolic Riemann surfaces must be a diffeomorphism. The same result was obtained at the same time by Schoen and Shing-Tung Yau.

Major publications
Over the course of forty years, Sampson published around twenty research articles.

References

American mathematicians
1926 births
2003 deaths
Princeton University alumni